Yazman , is a city and capital of Yazman Tehsil of Bahawalpur District, in southern Punjab, Pakistan. It is located at an altitude of 115 metres (380 feet).

History
Yazman is primarily called a gateway to the Cholistan Desert. It is the largest tehsil of Bahawalpur District. Yazman is a unique offspring of the process of colonization of the defunct state of Bahawalpur and it was named after a city of “Yazman” in a Syrian region of Balkh.

Yazman is actually a seven to eight decades older city. The following three factors played a vital role in its colonization and development.
1-It is situated at a starting point of Cholistan, 32 kilometers from Bahawalpur (The capital of the ex-state of Bahawalpur and a commissionerate and divisional headquarters after its merger into Pakistan)
2-The colonization as a result of the completion of Satluj Valley Project canal system.
3-An important station of the Cholistan or Colony Railway Line laid down from Samma Satta, Bahawalpur to Fort Abbas via Yazman.
Yazman came into being because an administrative unit was required in the colony area of Cholistan.

After 1955 the coming years heralded a new era of development and progress and its infrastructure was enhanced to the maximum extent. With effect from 1 July 1984 Yazman gained the status of Tahsil with a high profile socio-economic and agrarian progress.

Tehsil level offices of all important departments i.e. Police, Agriculture, Social Welfare, Education, Food, Forest, sports, irrigation, electricity, telephone and branches of all the national banks are operational here. Special focus on the development of Cholistan has been a special phenomenon. After devolution, many development projects of education, irrigation, communication, public health engineering and electricity have so far been carried out. The famous village of this area is Chak No 58/DB
Chak No 114/DNB
Chak No 39/DB Near Kudwala
Chak No 106/DB, Yazman Mandi
Chack No 128/DNB, Yazman mandi
 Chack 198/DNB,  Yazman Mandi Ch Tariq Basheer Cheema, Member of Pakistan National assembly belongs to this Village

Transportation 
Keeping in view to provide an effective infrastructural facility in the form of state controlled communication, a 124 miles project of a railway line from Samma Satta to Bahawal Nagar via Fort Abbas was started in November 1926. In the first phase railway line was laid down from Bahawal Nagar to Doga Bonga and was inaugurated in 1928. It was extended to Fort Abbas during the next two years. The project of remaining 80 miles from Fort Abbas to Samma Satta with the prominent stations of Mansoora, Quresh, Yazman and Qattal Ammara was completed during the period of next four to five years. This railway line could be utilized only for five years as on the request of the British Indian Government (a patron of the Bahawalpur state) all the infrastructure of railway line was given to the old patron to meet the urgent requirements of the Second World War at Indian Fronts.

The Nawab of Bahawalpur sanctioned the removal of 80 of the 124 miles railway track on 12 December 1940. It was lifted with a hope and plan to be re-laid after war. But that hope was never fulfilled and as a consequence the then required level of development in the colony area of Fort Abbas, Fort Marot and Yazman suffered a great setback in the days to come.

In 1943 Yazman was conferred upon the status of Notified Area Committee (NAC or Sub Tahsil) along with its neighboring cities of Hasilpur, for Abbas and others like Bahawal Nagar, Sadiq Abad, Chishtian and Haroon Abad with a subsequent extension up to 31 March 1947 and a Naib tahsildar was posted who was also ex-officio chairman of the Committee. In order to facilitate the agro-based economy, the State had a norm to alleviate some of the cities to the level of Mandi. Yazman was given the status of non-permanent Mandi in 1943–44 and was upgraded to the level of Permanent Mandi in 1949. The construction work of Yazman City was started through the auction of plots for commercial and residential purpose by the state administration. A brick kiln was approved for the promotion of construction work. One dispensary was established in 1942–43. The figures of the income and expenditure of Yazman committee as Rs.1621, Rs.2531 and Rs.1016, Rs.1364 are available in the administrative reports for the years 1942–43 and 1943–44. In the same year, there was a police station with a staff of one Sub inspector, one hawaldar and 18 constables. The state administration report for the year 1946–47 reflects that “the construction of water courses in Yazman is given due importance. Yazman is indicating a permanent low profile of development due to poor situation of the communication.” The provision of communication facilities was a major motive in this area. Apart from the railway line (discarded after only five years), lorry service was started between Bahawalpur to Fort Abbas and Yazman on the non-metaled road which continued up to the merger of the state in Pakistan till 1955. When the 32 kilometers road between Bahawalpur and Yazman was converted into metalled road, the transport service and its quality became better and comfortable.

Sites

Cholistan Desert 
The desert area which comprises one-third of the total area of the Bahawalpur District is called Cholistan or Rohi. In local dialect the word cholistan means desert without water and grass. The Cholistan can be divided into two parts: VIZ Smaller Cholistan and Greater Cholistan. Smaller Cholistan is situated along with the irrigated area while Greater Cholistan lies further south. Some parts of Cholistan are open plain spaces, locally called “Dahars” where soil is alluvial and suitable for cultivation. The other parts consist of sand dunes, called “Tibas” rising at some places up to 100 meters with vegetation peculiar to sandy tracts.

Cholistan was under regular irrigated cultivation till 1200 B.C, and under seasonal regular irrigated cultivation till about 600 B.C. With the drying up of the Hakra river, which some modern scholars associate with the mythological Sarasvati River, this area was gradually abandoned. There are more than 400 archaeological sites that were once populated as per survey report of Dr. Rafique Mughal which was carried out in the winter of 1978 and published in an international magazine. Cholistan is also called as valley of Hakra.

Average rainfall in Cholistan is 7.5 to 12.5 centimeters and subsoil water is brackish. Density population in Cholistan is only 09 persons per square kilometers. Animal population is around 1,200,000 which comprises camels, goats, sheep and cows. Cholistan is home of wildlife. Main source of drinking water both for human beings and animals, is rain water which is stored in “Tobas” and “Kunds” (water reservoir). Cholistanis constantly move in search of water. The desert on south was once habitable and forts of Derawar, Din Garh, Mauj Garh and Marot were situated at the bank of the dried up river called Sarswati, Hakra or Chughra. With the passage of time, its feeder channels changed route thus the vast tract of irrigated land converted into desert now called Cholistan.

The population of Cholistan consists of Muslims and non-Muslims with culture and language of their own. Cholistani clans migrate to the plains of the district in summer with their animals when rain and water is scarce. The current major clans of Cholistan include Jaams, Jats, Arain, Rajputs and Balochis. Their sub-clans include Laars, Chatta, Cheema, Warraich, Rehan, Ghuman, Sidhu, Uppal, Janjua, Rathore, Bhatti, Leghari, Lashari, and Dashti. Though these clans are unique because of their historical past and maintenance of their tribal traditions. The crafts and folktales are very much recognized.

Derawar Fort 
The most visited ancient site is Fort Derawar which is situated in the middle and on the interlinked old communication network of the Great Desert of Cholistan. Its distance from Ahmad Pur East is 50 km. The historians tell that Derawar Fort was constructed by the Raja of Bhatti tribes in 757 A.D. It is constructed in Hindu style of architecture. The first Nawab of Bahawalpur State Sadiq Muhammad Khan I while expanding the territory of the state attacked and got hold of the fort from Sardar Aghi Sing.

Raja Jajja from a Bhatti tribe was the ruler of Khanpur and Ahmadpur. Another Raja Diwa Sing sought permission from his maternal uncle Sardar Jajja Sing to construct the fort at a bank of Hakra in Cholistan which was granted and its erection started in 837 A.D. Due to unknown reasons, Raja Jajja ordered to suspend the process of construction. On the request of his sister, the mother of Diwa Sing, he again permitted to restart its construction. After its completion, it was named as "Dewar Awal" which became Derwar by the passage of time.

In 1825, Nawab Sadiq Muhammad Khan III built a mosque in front of it on the true model of Jamia Masjid Dheli. Marble of very fine quality was used in the mosque of Derawar. It is a unique monument that was constructed with a material that was brought there from the remote areas to that area of poor communication. The family graveyard of the Nawabs Half km from the mosque is also worth seeing because of its style and architecture.
CHAK NO 45/DNB

Chak Number 108/DNB 

Chak number 108 DNB is present in Yazman as a village with population of about 1,340. It is a highly green area with about 70% cultivated area. It has one government primary school which is the only government service being applied to the people of this village.

Chak Number 106/DB 
Chak 106/DB is present in the western side of the Yazman. Chak Number 106/DB has two Government Schools but the literacy rate is pretty low. Union Council & Basic Health Unit (BHU) Hospital in Chak 106/DB.

Chak Number 52/DB 
Chak number 52 DB is present in north eastern side of the Yazman. Chak Number 52/DB has three government schools but the literacy rate is pretty low.

Economy 
The main ingredients of the social set up of Yazman are dominantly agrarian. The city gives a passive look on account of socio-economic conditions. Economic activity depends on a favorable climate. Its population consists mainly of lower middle class and low paid communities. The area is not industrialized.

The people of Yazman no longer need to go to Bahawalpur for a good education as there is no shortage of educational institutions in Yazman city. There are more than 35 educational institutes in Yazman.

References 

Populated places in Bahawalpur District